Gremlins, Inc. is a digital turn-based strategy board game developed by Lithuanian indie game studio Charlie Oscar, set in the steampunk world of gremlins, initially released on Steam Early Access on October 22, 2015 for Windows, Mac OS, and Linux. The game transitioned into full release on Steam on March 11, 2016. The game is designed by Alexey Bokulev, who previously designed another turn-based strategy video game, Eador: Genesis, and is produced by Sergei Klimov.

References

External links
 

2016 video games
Cooperative video games
Digital board games
Early access video games
Economic simulation board games
Indie video games
Linux games
MacOS games
Multiplayer and single-player video games
Science fiction comedy
Steampunk video games
Top-down video games
Turn-based strategy video games
Video games developed in Lithuania
Windows games